Westerberg may refer to:

Places
 one of the four villages in the municipality of Winzenburg in Lower Saxony, Germany
 Westerberg (Baumberge), the highest hill in the Baumberge in North Rhine-Westphalia, Germany
 Westerberg (Lamstedt) a low ridge in the German state of Lower Saxony
 Westerberg (Osnabrück district), a district of Osnabrück, Lower Saxony, Germany

People with the surname
 Alf Westerberg, Swedish football manager
 Art Westerberg, academic at Carnegie Mellon University
 Bengt Westerberg, Swedish politician, party leader, member of the Riksdag and deputy prime minister
 Caj Westerberg, Finnish writer
 Einar Westerberg, Swedish flight surgeon
 Jesper Westerberg, Swedish football player
 Karl Westerberg, better known as Manila Luzon, an American drag queen and reality television personality
 Kurt Westerberg (born 1950), American composer
 Lars Westerberg, CEO and President of the Swedish automotive safety company Autoliv
 Leif Westerberg, Swedish professional golfer
 Oscar Westerberg, American Major League Baseball player
 Paul Westerberg, American musician
 Per Westerberg, Swedish politician and Speaker of the Swedish Riksdag
 Stig Westerberg, Swedish conductor and pianist
 Victor J. Westerberg, American politician

See also
 Maizels, Westerberg & Co., an investment banking firm